Zieria robertsiorum  is a plant in the citrus family Rutaceae and is endemic to the wet tropics of far north-eastern Queensland. It is a shrub with leaves composed of three leaflets, and flowers with four white petals. The flowers are arranged in groups of up to ten which are no longer than the leaves.

Description
The leaves are more or less flat and are covered with glandular hairs. The flowers are arranged in groups of mostly 3 to 10 in leaf axils but only up to three are open at the same time. The groups are no longer than the leaves. In common with other zierias, there are only four stamens.

Taxonomy and naming
Zieria robertsiorum was first formally described in 1996 by James Andrew Armstrong and the description was published in Australian Systematic Botany from a specimen collected on Mount Finnegan.

Distribution and habitat
This zieria grows in rock crevices and between granite boulders in windswept woodland in the wet tropic of far northern Queensland.

References

robertsiorum
Sapindales of Australia
Flora of Queensland
Plants described in 1996